Frederick Albert Travalena III (October 6, 1942 – June 28, 2009) was an American entertainer, specializing in comedy and impressions.

Early life
Bronx, New York-born and Long Island-raised, Travalena moved to Los Angeles and developed a multifaceted career with his characterizations of visible public figures.

Career
His television credits began in the 1970s, as a regular performer on The ABC Comedy Hour, where he once did a split screen impression of John Lennon on one side and Paul McCartney on the other, and the Dean Martin Roasts.  He had several voice credits on cartoons, as well as appearances on nationally broadcast children's programs.

Travelena made many guest appearances on game shows and dramatic programs in the 1970s, 1980s and 1990s. In the mid-1980s he hosted the game show Anything for Money (1984–85), a game where contestants attempted to guess how much money it would take an ordinary, unsuspecting person to participate in a silly stunt.

Among his guest appearances on game shows, he was on Super Password, hosted by Bert Convy, with The Huggabug Club star Audrey Landers, as well as Body Language, hosted by Tom Kennedy, and appeared on Match Game and Match Game Hollywood Squares Hour several times.

In 1982, Travalena played Bogey the Orangutan (in his Humphrey Bogart voice) from Shirt Tales.

In 1989, Travelena played Elvis Presley and Mr. Gibbel of Chippie Chipmunks group in a comedy sketch as part of The Super Mario Bros. Super Show!.  For the Macy's Thanksgiving Day Parade later that year, he portrayed the Joker. He guest starred in the series premiere of the short-lived 1991 sitcom Good Sports with Ryan O'Neal and Farrah Fawcett. After an actor impersonated Michael Jackson during the 1992 MTV Video Music Awards to accept the Best Alternative Music Video award on behalf of Nirvana, presenter  Dana Carvey bemusedly joked, “Fred Travalena does an amazing Michael Jackson!”

In 1993, Travalena hosted the game show Baby Races, which aired on the Family Channel for 26 episodes from September 12, 1993 to March 6, 1994.

Between 1998 and 2000, he voiced Julius Caesar (with a voice that was an impression of Frank Sinatra), William Clark, Marc Antony (both with an impression of Dean Martin), President Gerald Ford and many others on the Kids' WB's animated series Histeria!.

He appeared at casino theaters in Las Vegas, Reno, and Atlantic City, as well as performing arts theaters, cruise ships, and private "in-concert" performances.  He took part in a U.S.O. tour to entertain troops overseas, and was honored in 2004 by Club Italia with a Merit Achievement Award for his contributions to society. Also in 2004, he appeared on Bananas Comedy. He played radio DJ "Madman Mancuso" in The Buddy Holly Story.

On February 3, 2005, he received a star on the Hollywood Walk of Fame at 7018 Hollywood Blvd.

Death
Travalena was diagnosed with non-Hodgkin lymphoma in 2002 and prostate cancer in 2003. Following five years' remission, the lymphoma returned in 2008. Travalena died on June 28, 2009, at his home in Encino, California.

During his life, he and his wife credited his battle with cancer as a challenge of their Christian faith and a way to help others overcome the same conditions.

References

External links
 
 
 Obituary by the Associated Press

1942 births
2009 deaths
American game show hosts
American impressionists (entertainers)
American male voice actors
Deaths from cancer in California
Deaths from non-Hodgkin lymphoma
People from the Bronx
Male actors from New York City
Comedians from New York City
20th-century American comedians
21st-century American comedians
American Christians